Studies in Indian Politics is a Peer reviewed journal. It provides a forum to explain different aspects of Indian politics. It covers a wide variety of sub-fields in politics, such as political ideas and thought in India, political institutions and processes, Indian democracy and politics in a comparative perspective particularly with reference to the global South and South Asia, India in world affairs, and public policies.

It is published twice a year by SAGE Publications in association with Lokniti, Centre for the Study of Developing Societies .

This journal is a member of the Committee on Publication Ethics (COPE).

Abstracting and indexing 
 Studies in Indian Politics is abstracted and indexed in:
 DeepDyve
 Dutch-KB
 ProQuest: Worldwide Political Science Abstracts
 J-Gate

References 
 http://www.lokniti.org/
 http://publicationethics.org/members/studies-indian-politics

External links 
 
 Homepage

Biannual journals
SAGE Publishing academic journals
English-language journals
Publications established in 2013
Political science journals